In geometry, Pasch's theorem, stated in 1882 by the German mathematician Moritz Pasch, is a result in plane geometry which cannot be derived from Euclid's postulates.

Statement

See also

Ordered geometry
Pasch's axiom

Notes

References

External links 

Euclidean plane geometry
Foundations of geometry
Order theory
Theorems in plane geometry